Coillina is a monotypic genus of East Asian ground spiders containing the single species, Coillina baka. It was first described by C. M. Yin & X. J. Peng in 1998, and has only been found in China.

References

Gnaphosidae
Monotypic Araneomorphae genera
Spiders of China